Rob Jones (14 February 1964 – 31 July 1993), known by his nickname The Bass Thing, or by some as Bob Jones, was an English musician. He was a founding member and original bassist for The Wonder Stuff, based in Stourbridge (West Midlands, England).

Jones was born in Kingswinford, near Dudley, West Midlands in 1964. He joined Miles Hunt, Malcolm Treece, and Martin Gilks to form the Wonder Stuff in March 1986 and recorded the singles "A Wonderful Day" and "Red Berry Joy Town".

Jones played on the debut album The Eight Legged Groove Machine and the follow-up Hup. Following disagreements within the group, he left in December 1989, and went to America as soon as the group had played the final night of a sellout 3 night residence at Birmingham's Aston Villa Leisure Centre.

He married Michelle Robinson, Sid Vicious' last girlfriend, who had changed her name to Jessica Ronson in the late 1980s. 

After the move to New York he formed another band, The Bridge & Tunnel Crew, singing vocals and playing rhythm guitar, with Jessica sharing the song writing.

He died in New York on 31 July 1993, aged 29. The cause of his death is variously recorded as due to heart problems, heart attack, potentially caused by heroin, or drug-related causes. He left behind his mother Mary, brother Trevor, and second wife, Jessica Ronson-Jones.  His body was cremated and ashes were scattered at a number of locations – close to the Statue of Liberty and Ellis Island, near the Parachute Drop at Coney Island and in a flowerbed by the swimming pool at Tammy Wynette's house.

References 

1964 births
1993 deaths
English male guitarists
Male bass guitarists
People from Kingswinford
Deaths by heroin overdose in New York (state)
Cocaine-related deaths in New York (state)
Musicians from the West Midlands (county)
20th-century English musicians
20th-century English bass guitarists
The Wonder Stuff members
20th-century British male musicians
Drug-related deaths in New York City